Mawhtike is a town located within Laukkaing District, Shan State, Myanmar. It is also part of the Kokang Self-Administered Zone.

References

Populated places in Shan State